Hedycarya angustifolia, also known as the native mulberry or Australian mulberry, is a rainforest plant of south and eastern Australia. Its habitat is cool gullies and moist temperate forests, often at high altitude. Occasionally it is seen bordering sclerophyll forests.

The range of natural distribution is from King Island (39° S) in Bass Strait up to the Australian mainland in the state of Victoria, through New South Wales to the Conondale Range (26° S) in the hinterland of the Sunshine Coast of south east Queensland.

Description 
A shrub or small tree, though it occasionally can reach a height of 20 metres and a trunk diameter of 40 cm. The trunk is usually crooked with more than one main stem. The bark is thin; grey or fawn in colour, and is fairly smooth with some vertical lines.

Leaves alternate, toothed, ovate to lanceolate with a pointed tip; 8 to 20 cm long. The leaf stalk is 8 to 20 mm long. The midrib is raised below the leaf, but sunken above. The leaf veins are easily noticed.

Greenish flowers form on a raceme like cyme in the months of August to October. The fruit is a fleshy yellow drupe, ripening from December to January.

Uses 
Indigenous Australians used the wood for spear tips and to make bow drills.

References

External links
  (other publication details, included in citation)

Monimiaceae
Laurales of Australia
Trees of Australia
Flora of Tasmania
Flora of Victoria (Australia)
Flora of New South Wales
Flora of Queensland
Trees of mild maritime climate